Tomoki Sato (佐藤 友祈, Satō Tomoki, born 8 September 1989) is a Japanese Paralympic athlete. He won the silver medal in both the men's 400 metres T52 and men's 1500 metres T52 events at the 2016 Summer Paralympics held in Rio de Janeiro, Brazil.

In 2015, he won the gold medal in the men's 400 metres T52 event at the IPC Athletics World Championships held in Doha, Qatar. He also won the bronze medal in the men's 1500 metres T52 event.

He won the gold medal in the men's 400 metres T52 event at the 2019 World Para Athletics Championships held in Dubai, United Arab Emirates. He also won the gold medal in the men's 1500 metres T52 event.

References

External links 
 

Living people
1989 births
Place of birth missing (living people)
Paralympic athletes of Japan
Athletes (track and field) at the 2016 Summer Paralympics
Athletes (track and field) at the 2020 Summer Paralympics
Medalists at the 2016 Summer Paralympics
Medalists at the 2020 Summer Paralympics
Paralympic gold medalists for Japan
Paralympic silver medalists for Japan
Paralympic medalists in athletics (track and field)
World Para Athletics Championships winners
Medalists at the World Para Athletics Championships